Paradirphia is a genus of moths in the family Saturniidae first described by Charles Duncan Michener in 1949.

Species
The genus includes the following species:

Paradirphia andicola Lemaire, 2002
Paradirphia andrei Brechlin & Meister, 2010
Paradirphia anikae Brechlin & Meister, 2010
Paradirphia antonia (Dognin, 1911)
Paradirphia boudinoti Lemaire & Wolfe, 1990
Paradirphia citrina (Druce, 1886)
Paradirphia coprea (Draudt, 1930)
Paradirphia estivalisae Guerrero & Passola, 2003
Paradirphia frankae Brechlin & Meister, 2010
Paradirphia fumosa (R. Felder & Rogenhofer, 1874)
Paradirphia gabrielae Brechlin & Meister, 2010
Paradirphia geneforti (Bouvier, 1923)
Paradirphia hectori Brechlin & Meister, 2010
Paradirphia herediana Brechlin & Meister, 2010
Paradirphia hoegei (Druce, 1886)
Paradirphia ibarai Balcazar, 1999
Paradirphia lasiocampina (R. Felder & Rogenhofer, 1874)
Paradirphia leoni Brechlin & Meister, 2010
Paradirphia lieseorum Brechlin & Meister, 2010
Paradirphia manes (Druce, 1897)
Paradirphia oblita (Lemaire, 1976)
Paradirphia pararudloffi Brechlin & Meister, 2010
Paradirphia peggyae Brechlin & Meister, 2010
Paradirphia rectilineata Wolfe, 1994
Paradirphia rudloffi Brechlin & Meister, 2008
Paradirphia semirosea (Walker, 1855)
Paradirphia talamancaia Brechlin & Meister, 2010
Paradirphia torva (Weymer, 1907)
Paradirphia valverdei Lemaire & Wolfe, 1990
Paradirphia winifredae Lemaire & Wolfe, 1990

References

Hemileucinae